Hassans International Law Firm Limited is the largest law firm in Gibraltar. It has approximately 90 lawyers and was established in 1939 by Sir Joshua Hassan GBE, KCMG, LVO, GMH, KC. The firm's current senior partner is James Levy CBE KC, nephew of Sir Joshua. Former Hassans' partner Fabian Picardo KC is the current Chief Minister of Gibraltar.

Practice
The firm specialises in Corporate and commercial, financial services, tax, funds, legislative drafting, private client and trust law, property, shipping and company and trust management.

The firm operates out of its head office in Gibraltar and also has an office in Sotogrande, Spain.

Accreditation
Hassans is ranked as Tier 1 by  Chambers and Partners legal directory, and is rated as tier 1 in every category by the Legal 500 directory. At present the senior partner is James Levy CBE KC (nephew of the founding partner Sir Joshua Hassan) he was awarded a lifetime achievement award in the Chambers & Partners European Awards 2008.

Independent legal directories have consistently ranked Hassans as a Tier 1 law firm in Gibraltar and say "Gibraltar's largest law firm, receives praise all round for being the country's most highly reputed law firm". In February 2014, The Lawyer magazine ranked Hassans ninth in its annual list of Top 30 offshore law firms, often described as the offshore magic circle.

Offices
  Gibraltar
  Sotogrande, Spain

Line Group
Hassans also has its own Company and Trust Management corporations, Line Trust Corporation Limited and Line Management Services Limited.

References

External links
 GibraltarLaw.com (official website)
 Chambers and Partners Firm Profile

1939 establishments in Gibraltar
Gibraltar law
Law firms established in 1939
Law firms of Gibraltar